Shaun Wilkinson (born 22 January 1992) is an English professional darts player who competes in Professional Darts Corporation events.

At Q-School in 2022, Wilkinson won his Tour Card on by finishing in the final qualifying place on the UK Q-School Order of Merit, to get himself a two-year card on the PDC circuit.

Performance timeline

PDC European Tour

References

External links

1992 births
Living people
Professional Darts Corporation current tour card holders
People from Crewe
English darts players